The Ntwetwe Pan is a large salt pan within the Makgadikgadi region of Botswana. The Ntwetwe is one of three large pans within the Makgadikgadi, the other two being Nxai Pan and Sua Pan.  Ntwetwe Pan is now a seasonal lake with filling occurring in the rainy season. Ntwetwe was first described to the European world by David Livingstone, pursuant to his explorations in this region. Significant archaeological recoveries have occurred within the Nwetwe Pan, including Stone Age tools from people who lived in this area, in an earlier time of prehistory when a large year round lake occupied the Nwetwe Pan area within the Makgadikgadi.

See also
* Semowane River

References
 David Livingstone (1868) Missionary Travels and Researches in South Africa: Including a Sketch of Sixteen Years' Residence in the Interior of Africa, Harper Publishers.
 Bryan Robert Davies and Keith F. Walker (1986) The Ecology of River Systems, Published by Springer, 733 pages, .
 C.Michael Hogan (2008) Makgadikgadi, The Megalithic Portal, ed. A. Burnham

Line notes

Salt flats of Botswana
Makgadikgadi Pan